The Women's moguls competition at the FIS Freestyle Ski and Snowboarding World Championships 2021 was held on 8 March 2021.

Qualification
The qualification was started at 09:30. The best 18 skiers qualified for the final.

Final
The final was started at 15:00.

References

Women's moguls